"I Happen to Like New York" is a popular song written by Cole Porter for the 1930 musical The New Yorkers when it was introduced by Oscar Ragland.

The song has become a standard of the Great American Songbook, with recordings by many different artists.  Judy Garland recorded the song for her 1962 album The Garland Touch, while Caterina Valente recorded the song as the title track of her 1964 album.  The song opens the 1987 Liza Minnelli live album At Carnegie Hall.  A 1973 recording by Bobby Short from the album Live at the Café Carlyle was used in the 1993 film Manhattan Murder Mystery. British-born singer Dorothy Carless closes her album Mixed Emotions (1956) with the song.

References

See also
List of 1930s jazz standards
List of songs about New York City

1930 songs
Songs written by Cole Porter
Songs from The New Yorkers
Judy Garland songs
Caterina Valente songs
1930s jazz standards
Songs about New York City